Hoplodactylus delcourti, also commonly known as kawekaweau, Delcourt's sticky-toed gecko and Delcourt's giant gecko, is an extinct species of lizard in the family Diplodactylidae. Scientifically it is known from just one taxidermied specimen that was rediscovered unlabelled in a museum in France. The origin of the specimen is unknown; New Zealand and New Caledonia have been suggested. The idea that Hoplodactylus delcourti is the kawekaweau of Maori tradition has been contested.

History
According to his own report, in 1870, a Māori chief killed a kawekaweau he found under the bark of a dead rata tree in the Waimana Valley in Te Urewera. This is the only documented report of anyone ever seeing one of these animals alive.  He described it as being "brownish with reddish stripes and as thick as a man's wrist". Whether his story was true or not is unknown.

A single stuffed specimen was "discovered" in the basement of the Natural History Museum of Marseille in 1986; the origins and date of collection of the specimen remain a mystery, as it was unlabelled when it was found. Scientists examining it have suggested that it was from New Zealand and was in fact the lost kawekaweau, a giant and mysterious forest lizard of Maori oral tradition. Attempts to extract DNA from the sole specimen in 1994 were unsuccessful though ancient DNA technology has significantly advanced since then. Trevor Worthy suggests that the specimen originated on an island of New Caledonia rather than New Zealand, due to a lack of fossil evidence for the lizard in New Zealand caves, despite abundant remains of all other known species of New Zealand gecko. It was omitted from the Conservation Status of New Zealand Reptiles, 2021 on the basis that it was likely to be from New Caledonia.

Etymology
This animal's specific epithet delcourti is taken from the surname of French museum worker Alain Delcourt, who discovered the forgotten specimen in the Marseille museum.

Taxonomy
There are two lineages of New Zealand geckos: the nocturnal "brown" geckos (formerly all in genus Hoplodactylus, but now in several genera) and the diurnal "green" geckos (genus Naultinus). The kawekaweau belongs to the nocturnal "brown" gecko lineage. Both lineages belong to a group that is found only in Australia, New Zealand and New Caledonia.

Notes

References

Extinct reptiles of New Zealand
Hoplodactylus
Reptile extinctions since 1500
Reptiles described in 1986
Geckos of New Caledonia
Taxa named by Aaron M. Bauer
Taxa named by Anthony Patrick Russell
Species known from a single specimen